Santa Cruz Island is one of the Galápagos Islands with an area of  and a maximum altitude of . Situated in the center of the archipelago, Santa Cruz is the second largest island after Isabela. Its capital is Puerto Ayora, the most populated urban centre in the islands. On Santa Cruz, there are some small villages, whose inhabitants work in agriculture and cattle raising.

Its summit contains a shallow caldera that has been largely buried by youthful pit craters and cinder cones with well-preserved craters. The most recent eruptions may have occurred only a few thousand years ago with the effusion of sparsely vegetated lava flows from vents on the north flank and along the summit fissure. As a testimony to its volcanic history there are two big holes formed by the collapse of a magma chamber: Los Gemelos, or "The Twins".

Named after the Holy Cross, its English name (Indefatigable) was given after a British vessel HMS Indefatigable. Santa Cruz hosts the largest human population in the archipelago at the town of Puerto Ayora, with a total of 18,000 residents on the island.

Tortuga Bay is located on the Santa Cruz Island near Puerto Ayora where fauna such as marine iguanas, birds, Galapagos crabs can be seen. There is also a mangrove where white tip reef sharks and the gigantic Galápagos tortoises can be sighted.

Points of interest

 Charles Darwin Research Station
 Headquarters of the Galápagos National Park Service
 Lava tunnels
 El Chato and Rancho Primicias Giant Tortoise Reserves
 Itabaca Channel
 Black Turtle Cove
 Cerro Dragón
 Tortuga Bay
 Playa El Garrapatero
 Los Gemelos
 Stand of Scalesia - daisy trees

Twin towns – sister cities
On June 19, 2002, the cities of Seabrook, Texas and Santa Cruz Island finalized a sister city status during a ceremony at Seabrook City Hall.

References

Islands of the Galápagos Islands
Calderas of the Galápagos Islands
Polygenetic shield volcanoes